Ilario Cao (Hilarius Caius) was a Sardinian ecclesiastic active in Rome during the first thirty years of the eleventh century, often retrospectively called a Cardinal. He was born in Cagliari. He urged Pope Benedict VIII to organise an expedition to free his native land from Muslim pirates, who were establishing themselves in the south of the island, based out of Cagliari. A Pisan–Genoese expedition (1016) resulted, which expelled the Muslims. 

Ilario had two sons: Costantino (Constantinus) and Atanagio or Anastasio (Anastasius). The former built a hospital in Trastevere for poor Sardinians, which was destroyed in the later sack of Rome (1527). In 1068 Anastasio's son Benedetto erected a tombstone in the church of San Crisogono over his father's sepulchre bearing this inscription:

Notes

References
Travis Bruce. "The Politics of Violence and Trade: Denia and Pisa in the Eleventh Century". Journal of Medieval History 32 (2006) 127–42. 
Pasquale Tola. Dizionario biografico degli uomini illustri di Sardegna, vol. I, Manlio Brigaglia, ed. Nuoro: Ilisso, 2001 [Turin, 1838], pp. 277–78. 

People from Sardinia
Sardinian Roman Catholic priests